Coleophora seminella is a moth of the family Coleophoridae. It is found in Canada, including Nova Scotia and Ontario.

The larvae feed on the leaves of Aster species. They create a trivalved, tubular silken case.

References

seminella
Moths of North America
Moths described in 1946